Quinto Vicentino is a town and comune in the province of Vicenza, Veneto, Italy. It is east of A31.

The town is the birthplace of Urbano Lazzaro, the Italian partisan who identified and arrested Benito Mussolini in 1945. Its main attraction is Villa Thiene

Sources
(Google Maps)

Cities and towns in Veneto